John Gwinn III (June 11, 1791 – September 1, 1849) was a United States Navy officer born in Maryland. During the War of 1812, he was a POW after the Royal Navy had captured  in 1814 and he later commanded .

While transporting U.S. ambassador Daniel Smith McCauley and his family to Egypt, McCauley's wife gave birth to a son, who was named Constitution Stewart McCauley. At Gaeta on August 1 Gwinn received on board King Ferdinand II and Pope Pius IX. This would be the first time a Pope had set foot on American territory. At Palermo on September 1, 1849, Captain Gwinn died of chronic gastritis and was buried near Lazaretto on the 9th, ending a 40-year Navy career. Gwinn's body was moved to Glenwood Cemetery in Philadelphia, Pennsylvania a few years later and remained there until 1931 when he was reinterred at Arlington National Cemetery, in Arlington, Virginia.

References

Bibliography

External links

 

1791 births
1849 deaths
United States Navy officers
War of 1812 prisoners of war held by the United Kingdom
Burials at Arlington National Cemetery
Burials at Glenwood Cemetery/Glenwood Memorial Gardens
Commanders of the USS Constitution